Alzheimer's is a 2010 Egyptian comedy directed by Amr Arafa and film starring Adel Emam.

Plot
Mahmoud (played by Emam) realizes one morning that he cannot recognize the people who work at his home, including his nurse Mona (Nelly Karim).  However, he has actually been deceived by his children to believe that he has Alzheimer's disease, so they can get control of his wealth to pay off their own debts.

Cast
Adel Emam - Mahmoud Shuaib 
Nelly Karim - Mona
Ahmed Rizk - Karim
Saeed Saleh - Omar Kamal

References

External links
 

2010 films
2010s Arabic-language films
2010 comedy films
Egyptian comedy films